The following is a list of radio stations owned by Cumulus Media. Cumulus is the second largest radio station operator in the United States, having owned or operated 505 stations in 120 markets as of September 16, 2011. As of December 31, 2017, Cumulus owns and operates 405 stations in 86 markets. The number of stations dropped between 2011 and 2014 due to sales of clusters to other broadcasting companies. Cumulus Media stations are also available on online streaming services iHeartRadio and TuneIn. All stations are identified as "A Cumulus Media Station" during station identifications.

Alabama
Birmingham
WAPI – 1070 – News/talk (simulcast of WZRR)
WJOX – 690 – Sports
WJOX-FM – 94.5 – Sports
WJQX – 100.5 — ESPN Radio
WUHT – 107.7 – Urban adult contemporary
WZRR – 99.5 – News/talk

Huntsville
WHRP – 94.1 – Urban adult contemporary
WUMP – 730/103.9 – Sports
WVNN – 770 – News/talk
WVNN-FM – 92.5 – News/talk (simulcast of WVNN)
WWFF-FM – 93.3 – Country/Nash Icon
WZYP – 104.3 – Contemporary hit radio

Mobile
WABD – 97.5 – Contemporary hit radio
WBLX-FM – 92.9 – Urban contemporary
WDLT-FM – 104.1 – Urban adult contemporary
WGOK – 900 – Gospel
WXQW – 660 – News/talk

Montgomery
WHHY-FM – 101.9 – Contemporary hit radio
WLWI – 1440 – News/talk
WLWI-FM – 92.3 – Country
WMSP – 740 – Sports
WMXS – 103.3 – Adult contemporary
WXFX – 95.1 – Classic rock

Arizona
Tucson
KCUB – 1290 – Sports
KHYT – 107.5 – Classic hits
KIIM-FM – 99.5 – Country
KSZR – 97.5 – Classic hip hop
KTUC – 1400 – Oldies/adult standards

Arkansas
Fayetteville
KAMO-FM – 94.3 – Country/Nash Icon
KFAY – 1030 – News/talk
KKEG – 98.3 – Rock
KMCK-FM – 105.7 – Contemporary hit radio
KQSM-FM – 92.1 – Sports
KRMW – 94.9 – Adult album alternative
KYNG – 1590 – Sports

Fort Smith
KBBQ-FM – 102.7 – Rhythmic contemporary
KNSH – 100.7 – Country/Nash FM
KOMS – 107.3 – Classic country

Little Rock
KAAY – 1090 – Brokered/Christian
KARN – 920 – Sports
KARN-FM – 102.9 – News/talk
KFOG – 1250 – Mainstream urban (simulcast of KIPR)
KIPR – 92.3 – Mainstream urban
KLAL – 107.7 – Contemporary hit radio
KURB – 98.5 – Adult contemporary

California
Fresno
KMGV – 97.9 – Rhythmic oldies
KMJ – 580 – News/talk
KMJ-FM – 105.9 – News/talk (simulcast of KMJ)
KSKS – 93.7 – Country
KWYE – 101.1 – Hot adult contemporary

Los Angeles
KABC – 790 – News/talk

Oxnard/Ventura
KBBY-FM – 95.1 – Adult contemporary
KHAY – 100.7 – Country
KRUZ – 103.3 – Classic hits
KVYB – 106.3 – Contemporary hit radio

San Francisco
KGO – 810 – Sports betting
KNBR – 680 – Sports
KNBR-FM – 104.5 – Sports
KSAN – 107.7 – Classic rock
KSFO – 560 – News/talk
KTCT – 1050 – Sports (simulcast of KNBR)

Stockton/Modesto
KATM – 103.3 – Country
KDJK – 103.9 – Classic rock (simulcast of KHKK)
KESP – 970 – CBS Sports Radio
KHKK – 104.1 – Classic rock
KHOP – 95.1 – Contemporary hit radio
KJOY – 99.3 – Adult contemporary
KWIN – 97.7 – Mainstream urban
KWNN - 98.3 - Mainstream urban (simulcast of KWIN)

Colorado
Colorado Springs
KATC-FM – 95.1/104.9 – Country
KCSF – 1300 – Sports
KKFM – 98.1 – Classic rock
KKMG – 98.9 – Contemporary hit radio
KKPK – 92.9 – Adult contemporary
KVOR – 740 – News/talk

Connecticut
New London
WMOS – 102.3 – Classic rock (operated by Mohegan Sun)
WQGN-FM – 105.5 – Contemporary hit radio
WXLM – 980 – News/talk

District of Columbia
Washington
WMAL-FM – 105.9 – News/talk
WSBN – 630 – Sports

Florida
Fort Walton Beach
WFTW – 1260/107.5 – News/talk
WKSM – 99.5 – Active rock
WNCV – 93.3 – Adult contemporary
WYZB – 105.5 – Country/Nash FM
WZNS – 96.5 – Contemporary hit radio

Melbourne
WAOA-FM – 107.1 – Contemporary hit radio
WHKR – 102.7 – Country
WLZR – 1560/107.9 – CBS Sports Radio
WROK-FM – 95.9 – Classic rock

Pensacola
WCOA – 1370/104.9 – News/talk
WJTQ – 100.7 – Classic hits
WMEZ – 94.1 – Adult contemporary
WRRX – 106.1 – Urban adult contemporary
WXBM-FM – 102.7 – Country

Tallahassee
WBZE – 98.9 – Adult contemporary
WGLF – 104.1 – Classic hits
WHBX – 96.1 – Urban adult contemporary
WWLD – 102.3 – Urban contemporary
WWLD-HD2 – 98.3 – Gospel

Georgia
Atlanta
WKHX-FM – 101.5 – Country
WNNX – 100.5 – Classic Alternative
WWWQ – 99.7 – Contemporary hit radio
WWWQ-HD2 — 98.9 – WNNX simulcast, Classic Alternative
WWWQ-HD3 – 97.9 – Classic hip hop

Macon
WDEN-FM – 99.1 – Country
WLZN – 92.3 – Urban contemporary
WMAC – 940 – News/talk
WMGB – 95.1 – Contemporary hit radio
WPEZ – 93.7 – Adult contemporary

Savannah
WEAS-FM – 93.1 – Urban contemporary
WIXV – 95.5 – Classic rock
WJCL-FM – 96.5 – Country
WTYB – 103.9 – Urban adult contemporary

Idaho
Boise
KBOI – 670 – News/talk
KBOI-FM - 93.1 - News/talk (Simulcast of KBOI)
KIZN – 92.3 – Country
KKGL – 96.9 – Classic rock
KQFC – 97.9 – Soft adult contemporary
KTIK – 1350/95.3 – CBS Sports Radio

Illinois
Bloomington
WBNQ – 101.5 – Contemporary hit radio
WBWN – 104.1 – Country
WJBC – 1230/102.1 – News/talk
WJBC-FM – 93.7 – Country/Nash Icon
WJEZ – 98.9 – Classic hits

Chicago
WKQX – 101.1 – Alternative rock
WLS – 890 – News/talk
WLS-FM – 94.7 – Classic hits

Peoria
WFYR – 97.3 – Country
WGLO – 95.5 – Classic rock
WIXO – 105.7 – Active rock
WVEL – 1140 – Urban contemporary gospel
WZPW – 92.3 – Rhythmic contemporary

Indiana
Indianapolis
WFMS – 95.5 – Country
WJJK – 104.5 – Classic hits
WNDX – 93.9 – Mainstream Rock
WNTR — 107.9 — Hot adult contemporary
WXNT — 1430 — CBS Sports Radio
WZPL — 99.5 — Contemporary hit radio

Kokomo
WWKI – 100.5 – Country

Muncie
WLTI – 1550 – Country/Real Country
WMDH-FM – 102.5 – Country/Nash FM

Iowa
Des Moines
KBGG – 1700/101.3 – Sports
KGGO – 94.9 – Classic rock
KHKI – 97.3 – Country/Nash FM
KJJY – 92.5 – Country
KWQW – 98.3 – Contemporary hit radio

Kansas
Kansas City
KCFX – 101.1 – Classic rock
KCHZ – 95.7 – Contemporary hit radio
KCJK – 105.1 – Alternative rock
KCMO – 710/103.7 – News/talk
KCMO-FM – 94.9 – Classic hits
KCMO-FM-HD2 – 102.5 – Adult hits/Jack FM
KMJK – 107.3 – Urban contemporary

Topeka
KDVV – 100.3 – Classic rock
KMAJ – 1440/93.5 – Talk radio
KMAJ-FM – 107.7 – Adult contemporary
KTOP – 1490 – CBS Sports Radio
KTOP-FM – 102.9 – Country
KWIC – 99.3 – Classic hits

Kentucky
Lexington
WLTO – 102.5 – Contemporary hit radio
WLXX – 101.5 – Adult hits
WVLK – 590/97.3 – News/talk
WVLK-FM – 92.9 – Country
WXZZ – 103.3 – Active rock

Louisiana
Baton Rouge
KQXL-FM – 106.5 – Urban adult contemporary
WEMX – 94.1 – Rhythmic contemporary
WRQQ – 103.3 – Classic hits
WXOK – 1460/95.7 – Gospel

Lafayette
KNEK — 1190 - Urban adult contemporary (simulcast with KNEK-FM)
KNEK-FM – 104.7 – Urban adult contemporary
KRRQ – 95.5 – Urban contemporary
KSMB – 94.5 – Contemporary hit radio
KXKC – 99.1 – Classic country

Lake Charles
KAOK – 1400 – News/talk
KBIU – 103.3 – Contemporary hit radio
KKGB – 101.3 – Classic rock
KQLK – 97.9 – Country/Nash Icon
KYKZ – 96.1 – Country

New Orleans
KKND – 106.7 – Gospel
KMEZ – 102.9 – Urban adult contemporary
WRKN – 106.1 – Country
WZRH – 92.3 – Alternative rock

Shreveport
KMJJ-FM – 99.7 – Urban contemporary
KQHN – 97.3 – Hot adult contemporary
KRMD – 1340/100.7 – Adult contemporary
KRMD-FM – 101.1 – Country
KVMA-FM – 102.9 – Urban adult contemporary

Massachusetts
Worcester
WORC-FM – 98.9 – Country/Nash Icon
WWFX – 100.1 – Classic hits
WXLO – 104.5 – Hot adult contemporary

Michigan
Ann Arbor
WLBY – 1290 – Business talk
WQKL – 107.1 – Adult album alternative
WTKA – 1050 – Sports
WWWW-FM – 102.9 – Country

Detroit
WDRQ – 93.1 – Country
WDRQ-HD2 – 93.1 HD2 – Country/Nash Icon
WDVD – 96.3 – Hot adult contemporary
WJR – 760 – News/talk

Flint
WDZZ-FM – 92.7 – Urban adult contemporary
WFBE – 95.1 – Country
WTRX – 1330 – Sports
WWCK – 1570/107.3 — Classic hits
WWCK-FM – 105.5 – Contemporary hit radio

Grand Rapids
WHTS – 105.3 – Contemporary hit radio
WJRW – 1340/106.1 – Sports
WKLQ – 94.5 – Adult album alternative
WLAV-FM – 96.9 – Classic rock
WTNR – 107.3 – Country

Muskegon
WLAW – 1490 – Country/Nash Icon (simulcast with WLAW-FM)
WLAW-FM – 97.5 – Country/Nash Icon
WLCS – 98.3 – Classic hits
WVIB – 100.1 – Urban adult contemporary
WWSN – 92.5 – Adult contemporary

Saginaw
WHNN – 96.1 – Adult contemporary
WILZ – 104.5 – Classic rock
WIOG – 102.5 – Contemporary hit radio
WKQZ – 93.3 – Active rock

Minnesota
Minneapolis
KQRS-FM — 92.5 — Classic rock
KXXR — 93.7 — Active rock
WGVX — 105.1 — Soft adult contemporary
WLUP — 105.3 — Soft adult contemporary (simulcast of WGVX)
WWWM-FM — 105.7 — Soft adult contemporary (simulcast of WGVX)

Mississippi
Columbus/Starkville
WKOR-FM — 94.9 — Country/Nash FM
WMXU — 106.1 — Urban adult contemporary
WNMQ — 103.1 — Contemporary hit radio
WSMS — 99.9 — Mainstream rock
WSSO — 1230 — Sports

Missouri
Columbia/Jefferson City
KBBM — 100.1 — Country
KBXR – 102.3 – Adult album alternative
KFRU – 1400/98.9 – News/talk
KJMO – 97.5 – Classic hits
KLIK – 1240/103.5 – News/talk
KOQL – 106.1 – Contemporary hit radio
KPLA – 101.5 – Adult contemporary

Nevada
Reno
KBUL-FM — 98.1 — Country
KKOH — 780 — News/talk
KNEV — 95.5/99.3 — Classic hip hop
KWYL — 102.9/106.1 — Rhythmic contemporary

New Mexico
Albuquerque
KDRF — 103.3 — Adult hits
KKOB — 770 — News/talk (simulcast of KKOB-FM)
KKOB-FM — 96.3 — News/talk
KMGA — 99.5 — Adult contemporary
KNML — 610/95.9 — Sports
KOBQ — 93.3 — Contemporary hit radio
KRST — 92.3 — Country
KTBL — 1050/94.5 — Active rock

New York
Buffalo
WBBF — 1120/98.9 — Classic hip-hop 
WEDG – 103.3 – Active rock
WGRF – 96.9 – Classic rock
WHLD – 1270 – Conservative talk
WHTT-FM – 104.1 – Classic hits

Syracuse
WAQX-FM – 95.7 – Active rock
WNTQ – 93.1 – Mainstream top 40
WSKO – 1260 – CBS Sports Radio

Westchester
WFAS – 1230 – Conservative talk

North Carolina
Fayetteville
WFNC — 640 — News/talk
WMGU — 106.9 — Urban adult contemporary
WQSM — 98.1 — Top 40
WRCQ — 103.5 — Mainstream rock

Wilmington
WAAV — 980/107.9 — News/talk
WGNI — 102.7 — Adult contemporary
WKXS-FM — 94.5 — Classic rock
WMNX — 97.3 — Urban contemporary
WWQQ-FM — 101.3 — Country

Ohio
Cincinnati
WFTK – 96.5 – Active rock
WGRR – 103.5 – Classic hits
WNNF – 94.1 – Country
WOFX-FM – 92.5 – Classic rock
WRRM – 98.5 – Adult contemporary

Toledo/Monroe
WKKO – 99.9 – Country
WMIM – 98.3 – Country/Nash Icon
WQQO – 105.5 – Contemporary hit radio
WQQO-HD2 – 100.7 – ESPN Radio
WRQN – 93.5 – Classic hits
WXKR – 94.5 – Classic rock

Youngstown
WBBW – 1240 – CBS Sports Radio
WHOT-FM – 101.1 – Contemporary hit radio
WLLF – 96.7 – CBS Sports Radio
WPIC – 790 – News/talk
WQXK – 105.1 – Country
WRQX – 600 – Talk
WYFM – 102.9 – Classic rock
WWIZ – 103.9 – Oldies

Oklahoma
Oklahoma City
KATT-FM — 100.5 — Mainstream rock
KKWD — 104.9 — Adult Hits
KWPN — 640 — ESPN Radio
KYIS — 98.9 — Hot adult contemporary
WKY — 930 AM — Sports Talk (simulcast with WWLS-FM)
WWLS-FM — 98.1 — Sports Talk

Oregon
Eugene
KEHK — 102.3 — Adult top 40
KNRQ — 103.7/98.5 — Alternative rock
KUGN — 590/98.1 — News/talk
KUJZ — 95.3 — CBS Sports Radio
KZEL-FM — 96.1/96.7/99.3/102.1 — Classic rock

Pennsylvania
Allentown
WEEX - 1230 - Fox Sports Radio
WODE-FM - 99.9 - Classic rock

Allentown/Bethlehem
WCTO – 96.1 – Country
WLEV – 100.7 – Adult contemporary
WWYY - 107.1 - Country (simulcast of WCTO)

Erie
WQHZ – 102.3 – Classic rock
WRIE – 1260/96.3 – CBS Sports Radio
WXKC – 99.9 — Adult contemporary
WXKC-HD2 — 104.3 — Classic hip hop
WXTA – 97.9 – Country/Nash FM

Harrisburg
WHGB – 1400/96.5/95.3 – CBS Sports Radio
WNNK-FM – 104.1 – Hot adult contemporary
WQXA-FM – 105.7 – Active rock
WTPA-FM – 93.5 – Classic rock
WWKL – 106.7 – Contemporary hit radio

Lancaster
WIOV-FM – 105.1 – Country

Wilkes-Barre
WBHD - 95.7 - Contemporary hit radio
WBHT – 97.1 – Contemporary hit radio
WBSX – 97.9 – Active rock
WMGS – 92.9 – Adult contemporary
WSJR – 93.7 – Country/Nash FM

York
WARM-FM – 103.3 – Adult contemporary
WSBA – 910/93.9 – News/talk
WSOX – 96.1 – Classic hits

Rhode Island
Providence
WEAN-FM — 99.7 — News/talk (simulcast of WPRO)
WPRO — 630 — News/talk
WPRO-FM — 92.3 — Contemporary hit radio
WPRV — 790 — Sports betting
WWKX — 106.3 — Rhythmic contemporary
WWLI — 105.1 — Adult contemporary

South Carolina
Charleston
WIWF — 96.9 — Classic hits
WMGL — 107.3 — Urban adult contemporary
WSSX-FM — 95.1 — Contemporary hit radio
WTMA — 1250 — News/talk
WWWZ — 93.3 — Mainstream urban

Columbia
WISW — 1320 — ESPN Radio
WLXC — 103.1 — Urban adult contemporary
WNKT — 107.5 — Sports
WOMG — 98.5 — Classic hits
WTCB — 106.7 — Adult contemporary

Florence
WBZF — 98.5 — Urban contemporary gospel
WCMG — 94.3 — Urban adult contemporary
WMXT — 102.1 — Classic rock
WQPD — 100.5 — Hot adult contemporary
WWFN-FM — 100.1 — Classic country
WYMB — 920 — Sports
WYNN — 540 — Urban contemporary gospel (simulcast of WBZF)
WYNN-FM — 106.3 — Mainstream urban

Myrtle Beach
WAYS — 1050/101.9 — Fox Sports Radio
WDAI — 98.5 — Urban contemporary
WLFF — 106.5 — Country/Nash FM
WSEA — 100.3 — Sports
WSYN — 103.1 — Classic hits

Tennessee
Chattanooga
WGOW – 1150 – News/talk
WGOW-FM – 102.3 – Talk radio
WOGT – 107.9 – Country
WSKZ – 106.5 – Classic rock

Knoxville
WIVK-FM – 107.7 – Country
WNML – 990 – Sports
WNML-FM – 99.1 – Sports (simulcast of WNML)
WOKI – 98.7 – News/talk

Memphis
WGKX – 105.9 – Country
WKIM – 98.9 – News/talk
WRBO – 103.5 – Urban adult contemporary
WXMX – 98.1 – Mainstream rock

Nashville
WGFX – 104.5 – Sports
WKDF – 103.3 – Country
WQQK – 92.1 – Urban adult contemporary
WSM-FM – 95.5 – Country/Nash Icon
WWTN – 99.7 – News/talk

Tri-Cities
WGOC – 1320 – Business
WJCW – 910 – Talk
WKOS – 104.9 – Country/Nash FM
WQUT – 101.5 – Classic rock
WXSM – 640 – Sports

Texas
Abilene
KBCY — 99.7 – Country
KCDD — 103.7 – Contemporary hit radio
KHXS — 102.7 – Classic rock
KTLT — 98.1 – Active Rock

Amarillo
KARX – 107.1 – Country/Nash Icon
KPUR – 1440 – CBS Sports Radio
KPUR-FM – 95.7 – Texas country
KQIZ-FM – 93.1 – Rhythmic contemporary
KZRK-FM – 107.9 – Active rock

Beaumont
KAYD-FM – 101.7 – Country
KBED – 1510 – CBS Sports Radio
KIKR – 1450 – CBS Sports Radio (simulcast of KBED)
KQXY-FM – 94.1 – Contemporary hit radio
KTCX – 102.5 – Urban contemporary

Dallas/Fort Worth
KLIF-FM – 93.3 – 1990s-2000s hits
KLIF – 570 – News/talk
KPLX – 99.5 – Country
KSCS – 96.3 – Country
KTCK – 1310 – Sports talk
KTCK-FM – 96.7 – Sports talk (simulcast of KTCK)
WBAP – 820 – News/talk

Houston
KRBE – 104.1 – Contemporary hit radio

Wichita Falls
KLUR – 99.9 – Country
KOLI – 94.9 – Texas country
KQXC-FM – 103.9 – Contemporary hit radio
KYYI – 104.7 – Classic rock

Utah
Salt Lake City
KBEE — 98.7/92.3/95.3 — Adult contemporary
KBER — 101.1 — Mainstream rock
KENZ — 94.9 — Top 40
KHTB — 101.9 — Modern rock
KKAT — 860 — News/talk
KUBL-FM — 93.3 — Country

Wisconsin
Appleton
WNAM — 1280 — Adult standards
WOSH — 1490/93.9 — News/talk
WPKR — 99.5 — Country
WVBO — 103.9 — Classic hits
WWWX — 96.9 — Alternative rock

Green Bay
WDUZ — 1400/95.5 — Sports (simulcast of WDUZ-FM)  University of Wisconsin Green Bay Men's and Women's Basketball.
WDUZ-FM — 107.5 — Sports
WOGB — 103.1 — Classic hits
WKRU — 106.7 — Classic rock
WQLH — 98.5 — Adult contemporary

See also
Nash FM — national country music branding used by many Cumulus stations since 2013

References

Cumulus Media